Tantra is the second studio album by American rapper and singer Yung Bleu. It was released through Empire Distribution and Moon Boy University on November 11, 2022. The album contains guest appearances from Fivio Foreign, Zayn, Nicki Minaj, Kelly Rowland, French Montana, Lucky Daye, Lil Wayne, Ty Dolla Sign, and Ne-Yo. Production was handled by a variety of record producers, such as Bleu himself, Murda Beatz, Jerry Lang II, Robby Hale, Teldrick Smith, and Preme, among others.

Background
In an interview with iHeartRadio, Bleu explained his reasoning for why he chose tantra as the title of the album, saying that he had been "reading things about the Moon and my sign. It's really called 'Moon Magic' and it's like some spiritual stuff so I been reading into it. I wanted it to be called something that people ain’t really know so they could read into it and find out about it. … certain little key things about spirituality and the moon."

Release and promotion
After announcing the album and its cover art on November 4, 2022, Bleu revealed the tracklist for the album four days later.

Singles
The lead single of the album, "Walk Through the Fire", which features fellow American singer Ne-Yo, was released on January 21, 2022. The second single, "Love in the Way", a collaboration with Trinidadian-American rapper and singer Nicki Minaj, was released on September 16, 2022. The third single, "Life Worth Living", a collaboration with Moroccan-American rapper French Montana, was released on September 28, 2022. The sole promotional single, "Soul Child", which features fellow American rapper Lil Wayne, was released on November 8, 2022. "Feel It Inside" featuring Ty Dolla Sign was sent to rhythmic contemporary radio on January 10, 2023, as the fourth single.

Track listing

Charts

References

2022 albums
Albums produced by Murda Beatz
Interscope Records albums